The Order of the Reptile is the third full-length album by darkwave musical duo Ego Likeness. It was released on July 4, 2006 on Dancing Ferret Discs.

Track listing

References

Ego Likeness albums
2006 albums